Analapatsy is a town and commune in Madagascar. It belongs to the district of Taolanaro, which is a part of Anosy Region. The population of the commune was estimated to be approximately 20,000 in 2001 commune census.

Only primary schooling is available. The majority 80% of the population works in fishing. 10% are farmers, while an additional 5% receives their livelihood from raising livestock. The most important crop is beans, while other important products are peanuts, maize and cassava. Services provide employment for 5% of the population.

References and notes 

Populated places in Anosy